Boettcheria bisetosa is a species of flesh flies in the family Sarcophagidae.

References

Sarcophagidae
Articles created by Qbugbot
Insects described in 1914